The 1986–87 Houston Cougars men's basketball team represented the University of Houston as a member of the Southwest Conference during the 1986–87 NCAA men's basketball season. Following the 30-year tenure of legendary coach Guy Lewis, the team was led by first-year head coach Pat Foster and the team played its home games at the Hofheinz Pavilion in Houston, Texas.

The Cougars played in the NCAA tournament for the first time in three seasons, and lost in the opening round to Kansas, 66–55. Houston finished with a record of 18–12 (9–7 SWC).

Roster

Schedule and results

|-
!colspan=12 style=| Regular Season

|-
!colspan=12 style=| SWC Tournament

|-
!colspan=12 style=| NCAA Tournament

NBA Draft

References

Houston Cougars men's basketball seasons
Houston
Houston
Houston
Houston